Sarah Elizabeth Healey  (née Fitzpatrick; born 1975) is a British civil servant, appointed as Permanent Secretary for the Department for Levelling Up, Housing and Communities  in February 2023. Previously, she was Permanent Secretary at the Department for Digital, Culture, Media and Sport (DCMS).

Life and career
She read Modern History and English at Magdalen College, Oxford graduating BA, before pursuing further studies in Social Policy at the London School of Economics (MSc).Having entered 
HM Civil Service into the Prime Minister's Strategy Unit in the Cabinet Office in 2001, she served in the Department for Education as the director for Strategy and Performance for a year from 2009, and then as director for Education Funding 2010–2013, and then in the Department for Work and Pensions as director for Private Pensions for just under a year in 2013. She is married to a barrister and has three children.

In December 2013, Healey was promoted Director General in the then-Department for Culture, Media and Sport. In mid 2016, she joined the new Department for Exiting the European Union as one of their two Directors General. After two years at DExEU, she moved to replace Shona Dunn as the head of the Economic and Domestic Affairs Secretariat.

In March 2019, it was announced that Healey had been further promoted, returning to DCMS to be the Permanent Secretary, replacing Dame Sue Owen.

Healey was appointed a Companion of the Order of the Bath (CB) in the 2019 Birthday Honours, "for public service."

In February 2023, she replaced Jeremy Pocklington as Permanent Secretary of the Department for Levelling Up, Housing and Communities.

Notes

References

External links 

 Sarah Healey's page on gov.uk

1975 births
Living people
English people of Irish descent
Alumni of Magdalen College, Oxford
Alumni of the London School of Economics
British civil servants
British Permanent Secretaries
Companions of the Order of the Bath
Healey